Fredrik "Freddy" Nordström (born 22 February 1989 in Chertsey, Surrey) is an Anglo-Swedish racing driver and Forex trader living in London. He currently drives for CAAL RACING in the NASCAR Whelen Euro Series.

Biography

Early life
Nordström was educated at Danes Hill School in Oxshott, King's College School in Wimbledon and the European Business School London and Paris. He has a BA Hons degree in International Business and French. A keen racer from an early age, he started car racing in the British Racing and Sports Car Club (BRSCC) T-Cars Championship in 2003, being the youngest Motor Sports Association (MSA) licence holder up until then. Nordström has worked as a Forex trader for 8 years and is now the CEO of Neverfire Ltd. Freddy resides in London.

Racing career

T Cars 
Nordström raced go-karts from eight years of age to the age of 14 when he entered the T Car championship, a race series for drivers between fourteen and seventeen years of age. He finished fourth in both his first and second year.

Mini Challenge 
His young years belied a mature racing knowledge, fostered since his 2003 debut in the T Car Championships. His 2005 entry into the John Cooper Challenge (relaunched for 2006 as the Mini Challenge) saw him immediately competitive. His maiden Mini win and numerous podiums allowed him to finish fourth in the S Class Championship.

For 2006, Nordström's was fixed on winning the S Class title. In the 16 race season, he finished 14 times on the podium including three wins – a success for Nordström and the Advent Motorsport Team. In fact, Nordström finished every race to end the year with an enviable 100% points scoring record.

SEAT UK 
2007 saw Nordström move into the exciting arena of the SEAT Cupra UK Championship, a series with a reputation for nurturing the very best of new Saloon car talent. Nordström proved a pacesetter for the R Class from the onset. He finished the year in a credible fourth place having racked up three wins and finishing 50% of his races on the podium. In 2008 Nordström returned to the SEAT Cupra Cup, this time behind the wheel of a brand new SEAT León with backing from PlumberTraining.co. Once more, he was run by Advent Motorsport.

SEAT Supercopa, Spain 
With SEAT withdrawing the one make series in the UK, racing options were limited. After an upgrade to conform with the SEAT León Supercopa regulations, 2009 and 2010 saw Nordström racing on most tracks in Spain and Portugal for the 2010 SEAT León Supercopa Spain season and the following one. Racing was a challenge with 40+ entered cars of the same specification. The season was mixed with variable outcomes and quite a few mechanical issues. Nevertheless, this championship made Nordström ready for any future challenge and saw him taking on the current World Touring Car Cup (WTCC) driver 'Norby' Norbert Michelisz, TCR driver Pepe Oriola and Spanish superstar Oscar Nogués.

In addition Nordström entered the Brands Hatch rounds of the WTCC support race of the SEAT León Eurocup with good results. He was unfortunate to miss out on a second place by being given a drive through nine laps into the race for having a wheel outside the box on the starting grid. In spite of this he managed to claw his way back to sixth place. In this championship he raced against the Coronel twins.

British GT 
After 2 years of travelling to Spain, Nordström joined Lotus Sport UK, together with Leyton Clarke for an entry in the British GT Championship. The car was the new Lotus Evora, which saw the pair finish third in the championship only losing second place by a team 'stealing' points by entering the final round. The season was a challenge with a variety of gremlins appearing for this unproven car.

NASCAR Whelen Euro Series 
Having seen the Euro NASCAR at an exhibition at the Autosport show in Birmingham, Nordström joined the NASCAR Whelen Euro Series (various names during the years). Initially racing on mainly French circuits, the championship has grown over the years to now includes six European countries and drivers from a multitude of countries. After the first year Nordström joined the legendary, Le Mans winner Éric Hélary and his team RAPIDO RACING. This partnership lasted one and a half years until the team went into administration mid season which jeopardised the results. After a bad season in 2015, Nordström joined CAAL RACING who had a very strong track record of success. Unfortunately four crashes (two unavoidable on ovals) in 2016 hampered the season, but saw Nordström finish as high as sixth place in some races.

Other racing 
In addition to the various championships Nordström has competed in, he has appeared in the following race series:
 2008 Caterham Roadsport
 2009 Abarth 500
 2011 Porsche Carrera Cup Great Britain
 2012 Silverstone Britcar 24-Hour(BMW M3 E46)
 2013 Dubai 24 Hour (BMW)
 2014 Dubai 24 Hour (BMW)
 2016 Dubai 24 Hour (Porsche 991 Cup)

Racing record

Complete Racing results

NASCAR
(key) (Bold – Pole position awarded by qualifying time. Italics – Pole position earned by points standings or practice time. * – Most laps led.)

Whelen Euro Series – Elite 1

Whelen Euro Series – Elite 2

British GT GT4

SEAT León Supercopa 
(key) (Races in bold indicate pole position) (Races in italics indicate fastest lap)

Seat Cupra Championship UK

Seat León Supecopa Spain

Seat León Eurocup

Mini Challenge

T Car

24 Hours of Silverstone results

References

External links 
 www.freddynordstrom.com 

British motorsport people
Living people
1989 births
Sportspeople from Chertsey
Alumni of European Business School London
NASCAR drivers
Britcar 24-hour drivers
Mini Challenge UK drivers